Joseph Peter Brennan (14 February 1913 – 13 July 1980) was an Irish Fianna Fáil politician who served as Ceann Comhairle of Dáil Éireann from 1977 to 1980, Deputy Leader of Fianna Fáil from 1973 to 1977, Minister for Social Welfare from 1970 to 1973 and 1966 to 1969, Minister for Labour from 1969 to 1973, Minister for Posts and Telegraphs from 1965 to 1966, and a Parliamentary Secretary from 1959 to 1965. He served as a Teachta Dála (TD) from 1951 to 1980.

Early and personal life
He was born in Dunkineely, County Donegal, the son of farmer Francis Brennan and Hannah Carr. He was educated locally and developed great skill at Gaelic football, playing for his county team.

He began his working life as a freelance journalist with The Irish Press and the Donegal Democrat before establishing himself as an auctioneer, estate agent, and spirit merchant. During The Emergency he served in the FCA, retiring as Officer commanding of the South Donegal Battalion.

He married first Bridget (d. 1940), they had one son and four daughters. In February 1942 he married Margaret McDevitt.

Politics
He polled the highest number of first preferences in the  1949 Donegal West by-election but failed to be elected. Brennan was elected as a Fianna Fáil Teachta Dála (TD) for the Donegal West constituency at the 1951 general election and was re-elected at each election until his death. As constituency boundaries were changed, he represented Donegal South-West from 1961 to 1969, Donegal–Leitrim from 1969 to 1977, and Donegal from 1977 to 1980.

In 1959, when Seán Lemass succeeded as Taoiseach, Brennan was appointed as Parliamentary Secretary to the Minister for Finance. After the 1961 general election, he was appointed as Government Chief Whip, as Parliamentary Secretary to the Taoiseach, and Parliamentary Secretary to the Minister for Defence. After the 1965 general election, Brennan joined the cabinet when he was appointed as Minister for Posts and Telegraphs.

In 1966, when Jack Lynch succeeded as Taoiseach, Brennan was appointed as Minister for Social Welfare. Following the 1969 general election he was appointed as Minister for Labour. In the wake of the Arms Crisis in 1970 he was appointed to the additional portfolio of Social Welfare. After the 1973 general election, Fine Gael and the Labour Party formed a National Coalition government.

Fianna Fáil were returned to office after the 1977 general election. Brennan was elected Ceann Comhairle of Dáil Éireann, a position he held until his death in 1980, aged 67.

The by-election for his seat in the Donegal constituency was held on 6 November 1980, and won by the Fianna Fáil candidate Clement Coughlan.

He was president of the Statistical and Social Inquiry Society of Ireland between 1934 and 1938.

References

 

1913 births
1980 deaths
Fianna Fáil TDs
Donegal inter-county Gaelic footballers
Irish sportsperson-politicians
Members of the 14th Dáil
Members of the 15th Dáil
Members of the 16th Dáil
Members of the 17th Dáil
Members of the 18th Dáil
Members of the 19th Dáil
Members of the 20th Dáil
Members of the 21st Dáil
Ministers for Social Affairs (Ireland)
Parliamentary Secretaries of the 17th Dáil
Politicians from County Donegal
Presiding officers of Dáil Éireann
Statistical and Social Inquiry Society of Ireland
Government Chief Whip (Ireland)